Robert Lambart Harvey (born 21 August 1953) is a British Conservative Party politician, journalist and well known historian and author.

Education

Harvey was educated at Eton College and later at Christ Church, Oxford University where he obtained a BA in 1974 and MA in 1978.

Journalism

Harvey was foreign affairs lead writer for the Daily Telegraph (1987-1991) and assistant editor of The Economist (1981-1983).

Politics

Harvey first stood for Parliament, unsuccessfully, at Caernarvon in October 1974, where he was beaten by the future leader of Plaid Cymru, Dafydd Wigley. Five years later he contested Merioneth, once again being beaten by a Plaid Cymru incumbent, Dafydd Elis-Thomas. In the Conservative landslide of 1983 general election, he was elected to the House of Commons as MP for Clwyd South-West. He became a member of the House of Commons Foreign Affairs Committee. He served for one term before his defeat at the 1987 election by the Labour candidate Martyn Jones.

Think tanks

He was a member of the Wilton Park council (1984-1988) and a member of the advisory board of the Woodrow Wilson Chair of International Politics (1985-1992). He is an active member of the Caux Round Table.

Author

Robert Harvey is a prolific historian and author. In 2007 he edited and introduced the book entitled The World Crisis: The Way Forward after Iraq with works by Jimmy Carter, Henry Kissinger, George Shultz, Geoffrey Howe, Michael Heseltine, Zbigniew Brzezinski, Brent Scowcroft, Sam Nunn, Dick Lugar as well as himself. He has been translated into several languages and some of his titles have been widely read.

Books

Portugal: Birth of a Democracy (1978)
Blueprint of a Democracy (1978)
Fire Down Below: A Study of Latin America (1988)
The Undefeated: The Rise, Fall and Rise of Modern Japan (1994)
The Return of the Strong: The Drift to Global Disorder (1995)
Clive: The Life and Death of a British Emperor  (1998)
Liberators: Latin America's Struggle for Independence (2000)
Cochrane: The Life and Exploits of a Fighting Captain (2000)
A Few Bloody Noses: The American War of Independence (2001)
The Fall of Apartheid: The Inside History from Smuts to Mbeki (2002)
Comrades: The Rise and Fall of World Communism (2003)
Global Disorder (2003)
A Short History of Communism (2004)
The War of Wars: The great European Conflict 1793-1815 (2007)
The World Crisis: The Way Forward after Iraq, ed. (2007)
The Mavericks: The Military Commanders who Change the Course of History (2008)
American Shogun: MacArthur, Hirohito and the American Duel with Japan (2009)
Romantic Revolutionary: Simon Bolivar and the Struggle for Independence in Latin America (2011)

References

External links 

1953 births
Living people
Conservative Party (UK) MPs for Welsh constituencies
People educated at Eton College
Alumni of Christ Church, Oxford
UK MPs 1983–1987
British writers